Goran Jovanović (born 20 March 1972) is a Serbian former footballer who played as a defender.

Career
After starting out at Jastrebac Niš, Jovanović spent five seasons with Radnički Niš in the First League of FR Yugoslavia. He later played abroad in Russia (Anzhi Makhachkala), Hungary (Győr), and Iceland (Neisti D.). In 2002, Jovanović had a short stint with Car Konstantin, helping them win promotion to the Second League of FR Yugoslavia. He also played for amateur club Mladost Lalinac before hanging up his boots.

Honours
Anzhi Makhachkala
 Russian Cup: Runner-up 2000–01

References

External links
 
 

1972 births
Living people
Sportspeople from Niš
Serbia and Montenegro footballers
Serbian footballers
Association football defenders
FK Radnički Niš players
FC Anzhi Makhachkala players
FK Car Konstantin players
Győri ETO FC players
First League of Serbia and Montenegro players
Second League of Serbia and Montenegro players
Russian Premier League players
Nemzeti Bajnokság I players
Serbia and Montenegro expatriate footballers
Serbian expatriate footballers
Expatriate footballers in Russia
Expatriate footballers in Hungary
Expatriate footballers in Iceland
Serbia and Montenegro expatriate sportspeople in Russia
Serbia and Montenegro expatriate sportspeople in Hungary
Serbian expatriate sportspeople in Iceland